The Arizona Complex League Angels are a professional baseball team competing as a Rookie-level affiliate of the Los Angeles Angels in the Arizona Complex League of Minor League Baseball. The team plays its home games at Tempe Diablo Stadium in Tempe, Arizona. The team is composed mainly of players who are in their first year of professional baseball either as draftees or non-drafted free agents from the United States, Canada, Dominican Republic, Venezuela, and other countries.

History
The team first competed as member of the Arizona League (AZL) from 1989 to 1996. After a four-year absence, the team returned in 2001 and have been members of the league since then. Through 2005, the team played at Gene Autry Park in nearby Mesa. Since 2006, the team uses Tempe Diablo Stadium for night games, and plays day games in the neighboring minor league complex. Prior to the 2021 season, the Arizona League was renamed as the Arizona Complex League (ACL).

Roster

References

External links
 Official Site
 Baseball Reference

Arizona Complex League teams
Anaheim Angels minor league affiliates
California Angels minor league affiliates
Los Angeles Angels of Anaheim minor league affiliates
Professional baseball teams in Arizona
1989 establishments in Arizona
Baseball teams established in 1989
Sports in Tempe, Arizona